Perceval Gaillard (born 24 April 1983) is a French politician from La France Insoumise. He was elected member of the National Assembly for Réunion's 7th constituency in the 2022 French legislative election.

See also 

 List of deputies of the 16th National Assembly of France

References 

Living people
1983 births
People from Rouen
Members of Parliament for Réunion

La France Insoumise politicians
21st-century French politicians
Deputies of the 16th National Assembly of the French Fifth Republic